Champ Motorsport is a Chinese auto racing team based in Zhuhai, China. The team has raced in the TCR International Series, since 2016. Having also raced in the TCR Asia Series, Asian Formula Renault Series and China Formula 4 Championship amongst others.

Asian Formula Renault Series
Having first entered the championship in 2004. The team returned in 2005 and won the championship with Taiwanese driver Hanss Lin. The team kept entering the series for many years before again winning the title in 2013 with Colombian driver Julia Acosta.

China Formula 4 Championship
The team entered the first season of the China F4 series with Chinese drivers Chen Zhuoxuan, Liu Wenlong, Yang Fan and Xie Ruilin alongside 2013 Asian Formula Renault champion Julio Acosta. Acosta took seven out of eight possible victories, with Acosta having secured the title at the fourth round out of five of the championship. Acosta therefore did not take part in the final round of the 2015–16 season. For 2016 the team entered Liu Wenlong and Xie Ruilin again for a second season with the team.

Formula Masters China
The team made a one-off appearance in the series at their home circuit at Zhuhai International Circuit, with the team entering Xie Ruilin and Leong Hon Chio for the event.

TCR Asia Series
The team entered the Asian TCR series for 2016, with Henry Ho and Michael Ho driving a Honda Civic TCR each. The team finished fourth in the Teams' championship, with Henry Ho having taken three podiums.

TCR International Series

Honda Civic TCR (2016–)
After having raced in the 2016 TCR Asia Series, the team entered the 2016 TCR International Series with TCR Asia regular driver Michael Ho driving a Honda Civic TCR. However, Ho withdrew from 2016 Guia Race of Macau before the first practice session.

Timeline

References

External links
 

Chinese auto racing teams
TCR Asia Series teams
TCR International Series teams
Formula BMW teams
Formula Renault teams
Auto racing teams established in 2003